Basildon is a civil parish in the English county of Berkshire. It comprises the small villages of Upper Basildon and Lower Basildon, named for their respective heights above the River Thames.

Geography
The parish is bordered to the north by the River Thames and the Oxfordshire parishes of Goring and Whitchurch-on-Thames on the other side of the river. To the south of the river it is bordered by the parishes of Pangbourne, Bradfield, Ashampstead and Streatley. The parish forms part of the unitary authority of West Berkshire. It is within the Newbury parliamentary constituency.

History
Ancient flint axes have been found in Basildon but the earliest physical remains to be seen today are two Bronze Age ditch sections called Grim's Ditch (circa 2,400 BC). The Romans built a road through the parish between Silchester to Dorchester-on-Thames and a wealthy Romano-Briton erected a farm and villa alongside this. It was destroyed when Brunel's Great Western Railway was built through it in 1838. The ancient parish of Basildon with five manors covered the present civil parishes of both Basildon and Ashampstead. The main Basildon manor was mentioned in the Domesday Book (1086) as Bastedene. Before the Norman Conquest the manor of Basildon was held by a free woman named Aileva.

In 1349, many of the local populace died from the Black Death. The parish remained the centre of a quiet agricultural community thereafter, slowly growing prosperous. From the 17th century, it was the location of Basildon House, the country seat of the Fane family who later also built the Grotto in Lower Basildon, near the Thames.  The present house was built and the park laid out for Sir Francis Sykes in 1776. The history of the village then largely followed the fortunes of the estate owners. J. M. W. Turner stayed at Basildon Park and since he painted "Rain, Steam and Speed" in 1844, this painting has sometimes been said to show the Basildon railway bridge which stands in the valley below the house. However, it is generally accepted as showing the Maidenhead Railway Bridge.

Education
Basildon primary school, founded in 1875, is located in Upper Basildon and provides education for about 140 children. Secondary education is provided primarily by Theale Green School, 6 miles away in Theale.

Amenities

Public house
The parish has one public house, the Red Lion, in Upper Basildon.

Beale Park

Beale Park is a 40-acre outdoor wildlife park located between Basildon Park and the River Thames.

Transport
Thames Travel bus services 132/133 (Reading to Goring-on-Thames) serve Basildon.

Notable buildings

Churches
The parish has two churches. The Grade I listed St Bartholomew's Church in
Lower Basildon dates from the 13th Century and is now owned and maintained by the Churches Conservation Trust. The churchyard is notable as the resting place of Jethro Tull, the 18th century agriculturalist, whose modern gravestone can be seen there. St Stephen's in Upper Basildon was built in 1964. This replaced the temporary place of worship, located on the corner of Bethesda Street and Blandy's Lane, which was built in 1895.

Basildon Park

The National Trust property of Basildon Park, built by John Carr of York between 1776 and 1783 for Sir Francis Sykes, one of the East India Company nabobs, is situated between Lower Basildon and Upper Basildon. His grandson dissipated his fortune and so mistreated his wife that he ended up caricatured as Bill Sikes in Charles Dickens’s Oliver Twist. In 1838, the estate was sold to businessman, James Morrison and his family held it until 1929. The Morrison family built up an art collection which included works by Constable, Da Vinci, Hogarth, Holbein, Poussin, Rembrandt, Reynolds, Rubens, Titian, Turner and Van Dyck. Part of the surviving  collection hangs at Sudeley Castle in Gloucestershire, where their descendants live.

Demography

Notable people
Upper Basildon was the place of birth (1674) and Lower Basildon the place of burial (1741) of Jethro Tull, the English agricultural pioneer who helped bring about the British Agricultural Revolution. Other notable Basildonians include:

Charles Fane, 1st Viscount Fane
Charles Fane, 2nd Viscount Fane
George Fane
Sir Henry Fane
Captain Allen Francis Gardiner, the missionary pioneer, who started the first missionary station at Port Natal, Zululand and co-founded the City of Durban in South Africa.
Elspeth Hanson
Langton Iliffe, 2nd Baron Iliffe
Dorothy Montagu, Countess of Sandwich
James Morrison and his son, Charles Morrison, merchant banker, and grandson James Morrison, politician.
Sir Francis Sykes, 1st Baronet

Legacy
The British stationery company, Basildon Bond founded in 1911, is named after Basildon, taking its name when some of the directors fell to liking the alliteration of "Basildon" and "bond" whilst holidaying at Basildon Park, at the time owned by Major James Archibald Morrison.

References

External links

Upper and Lower Basildon Village Website
Royal Berkshire History: Basildon
Time Team excavation

Populated places on the River Thames
Villages in Berkshire
West Berkshire District
Civil parishes in Berkshire